Al-Wazireya or Waziriyah (Arabic: الوزيرية) is a neighborhood in the Adhamiyah District of Baghdad, Iraq. It is at one end of the Al-Sarafiya bridge, across the Tigris River from Utafiyah.

References

Wazireya